The Acer Stream  is a smartphone manufactured by Acer Inc. and powered by the Android 2.1 operating system. It has 3.7” AMOLED capacitive multi-touchscreen. It was announced at Computex 2010.

Hardware
The smartphone is shipped with the Android 2.1 "Eclair" operating system. It features a 3.7-inch AMOLED capacitive touchscreen with WVGA resolution, 5-megapixel camera capable with automatic geotagging supported by the integrated Assisted GPS antenna and digital compass.

The device is upgradable and powered by a Qualcomm Snapdragon 1 gigahertz processor and 512 megabytes random access memory. It also has 512 megabytes of read-only memory alongside its 2 gigabytes internal memory backed up with a microSD card slot capable of offering up to 32 gigabytes of expandable storage memory with 8 gigabytes included respectively.

Acer Stream support 720p video streaming via miniHDMI port and Dolby Mobile.

Software
The Acer Stream runs the Android operating system and integrated third party applications such as Facebook and Twitter social networks, and photo and video sharing abilities through Flickr and YouTube respectively. Other applications available include full HTML browser abilities for the Web, Google Search, Maps and Mail respectively, and a document viewer which opens Microsoft Office and PDF documents.

Acer Spinlet 
"Acer spinlet" is a pre-installed application to browse and listen to songs for free that can be instantly played back on the handset or shared with social networks such as Facebook or Twitter.

Acer urFooz 
"Acer urFooz" is a pre-installed application to create a virtual lookalike to post on social networks

Software updates
The Android 2.2 (FroYo) update was released.

See also
List of Android devices
Galaxy Nexus

References

External links
 
 Spinlet page
 Official Acer Stream features video

Stream
Android (operating system) devices
Mobile phones introduced in 2010